"Bittersweet Me" is a song by American rock band R.E.M., released as the second single from their 10th studio album, New Adventures in Hi-Fi (1996). Like much of the album, the song originated while the band were on the road for the Monster tour, although the song was only ever soundchecked and has never been played live as part of a concert. The song was a bigger hit in the United States than the first single from the album, "E-Bow the Letter", except on the Modern Rock Tracks chart, where the first single's number-two peak bested the number-six peak of "Bittersweet Me".

The CD single features a live cover of "Wichita Lineman", a song written by Jimmy Webb and made popular by Glen Campbell. The video for the single was shot in the style of an Italian movie entitled Stanco E Nudo (a translation of the line "tired and naked" in the song). It was included as a bonus video on the DVD release of In View - The Best of R.E.M. 1988-2003.

Critical reception
Larry Flick from Billboard described the song as "a strumming, easy-paced rocker that rings with the vintage R.E.M. sound—clever, mildly introspective verses that build to a full-throttle, pop-soaked chorus that permanently melts into the brain upon impact." He added, "It's a familiar formula that never seems to grow tired, mostly due to Michael Stipe's always believable, subtext-riddled vocals and tight instrumentation that sounds like it's unfolding live. Already connecting at rock radio, the single will gain top 40 approval within seconds."

Track listings
All songs were written by Berry, Buck, Mills, and Stipe unless otherwise indicated.

 7-inch, cassette, and CD single
"Bittersweet Me" – 4:06
"Undertow" (live)1 – 5:05

 12-inch and CD maxi-single
 "Bittersweet Me" – 4:06
 "Undertow" (live)1 – 5:05
 "Wichita Lineman" (Webb) (live)2  – 3:18
 "New Test Leper" (live acoustic)3 – 5:29

Notes
1 Recorded at the Omni Theater, Atlanta, Georgia; November 18, 1995. Taken from the live performance video, Road Movie.
2 Recorded at The Woodlands, Houston, Texas; September 15, 1995.
3 Recorded at Bad Animals Studio, Seattle, Washington; April 19, 1996.

Personnel
 Bill Berry – drums, tambourine
 Peter Buck – guitar
 Mike Mills – bass, organ, mellotron
 Michael Stipe – vocals
 Scott McCaughey – piano

Charts

Weekly charts

Year-end charts

Release history

References

External links
 

1996 singles
1996 songs
R.E.M. songs
Songs written by Bill Berry
Songs written by Michael Stipe
Songs written by Mike Mills
Songs written by Peter Buck
Song recordings produced by Bill Berry
Song recordings produced by Michael Stipe
Song recordings produced by Mike Mills
Song recordings produced by Peter Buck
Song recordings produced by Scott Litt
Warner Records singles